is a Japanese politician who served in the House of Representatives of Japan from 2009 until 2012.

Biography
Born in Tokyo, Yamazaki attended Hokkaido Asahikawa Higashi High School and graduated from Hokkaido University in 1971. After receiving her nursing license in April 1968, she would later work at several health facilities, before being director of the Japanese Nursing Association from 1995 until 2005; she was in the Ministry of Health, Labour and Welfare's Social Security Council as that organization's representative. She was also a professor at the Nursing School in Iwate Prefectural University.

In 2007, she ran as a proportional district candidate for the Democratic Party of Japan with  27,500 votes.

In 2009, she was elected to the Hokkaido proportional representation block.

In 2012, she came third place running for Hokkaido's 12th district with 25,501 votes.

In 2017, she ran as a proportional district candidate for the Democratic Party of Japan.

References

Living people
1980 births
21st-century Japanese women politicians
21st-century Japanese politicians
Japanese nurses
Members of the House of Representatives (Japan)
Female members of the House of Representatives (Japan)
People from Tokyo
Hokkaido University alumni
Academic staff of Asahikawa University